Dublin Swift is a high-speed catamaran built in 2001 by Austal as a passenger and vehicle catamaran ferry. After conversion to a Maritime Prepositioning ship the vessel was chartered by the United States Navy's Military Sealift Command until January 2018 as WestPac Express. It was then converted for civilian use as a passenger ferry by Irish Ferries and renamed Dublin Swift.

History
After a demonstration in 2001, Austal signed a three-year lease with Military Sealift Command for the WestPac Express.

In March 2011, the WestPac Express was deployed as part of the US response to the 2011 Tōhoku earthquake and tsunami. In recognition of this service, Admiral Mark Buzby presented the ship’s crew with United States Merchant Marine Outstanding Achievement Medal at a ceremony on board the ship in Yokohama, Japan. The lease was renewed successively until the end of 2017.

In April 2016 WestPac Express was sold to Irish Continental Group, who continued to lease it to the Military Sealift Command until the end of 2017.

With its charter to the US Navy completed, in January 2018 WestPac Express arrived in Belfast for refurbishment at Harland & Wolff to replace the Jonathan Swift on Irish Ferries' Dublin to Holyhead route. It entered service in April 2018.

Follow on orders
With a design based on the WestPac Express, Austal USA built 10 Spearhead-class expeditionary fast transport vessels for use by the United States Navy, the United States Marine Corps and the United States Coast Guard with a further two on order.

References

External links

Catamarans of the United States Navy
High speed vessels of the United States Navy
Individual catamarans
Military catamarans
Ships built by Austal
2001 ships